Saint-Paul-lès-Romans (literally Saint-Paul near Romans; Vivaro-Alpine: Sant Pau de Rumans) is a commune in the Drôme department in southeastern France.

Population

See also
Communes of the Drôme department

References

Communes of Drôme